Suchdol is the name of places in the Czech Republic:

Suchdol nad Lužnicí, a town in the South Bohemian Region
Suchdol nad Odrou, a market town in the Moravian-Silesian Region
Suchdol (Kutná Hora District), a market town in the Central Bohemian Region
Suchdol (Prostějov District), a municipality and village in the Olomouc Region
Suchdol (Prague), a district in Prague 6 of the Prague
Suchdol, a village and administrative part of Bujanov in the South Bohemian Region
Suchdol, a village and administrative part of Křimov in the Ústí nad Labem Region
Suchdol, a village and administrative part of Kunžak in the South Bohemian Region
Suchdol, a village and administrative part of Prosenická Lhota in the Central Bohemian Region
Suchdol, a village and administrative part of Vavřinec in the South Moravian Region

See also
Suchodol, Czech Republic